The large moth family Crambidae contains the following genera beginning with "R":

References 

 R
Crambid